Events in the year 1994 in the Republic of India.

Births 
25 Feb  Urvashi Rautela, actress
26 Feb - Bajrang Punia, Olympic medalist
13 March – Mohammed Siraj, cricketer

13 June – Deepika Kumari, archer
8 August – Mirabai Chanu, weightlifter
3 November – Sanusha, actress
11 November - Sanju Samson, cricketer
20 November  Priyanka Arul Mohan, actress.
14 December – Kuldeep Yadav, cricketer
20 December – Nazriya Nazim, anchor, model and actress
21 December  Athulya Ravi, actress.

Incumbents
 President of India – Shankar Dayal Sharma
 Prime Minister of India – P. V. Narasimha Rao
 Chief Justice of India – Manepalli Narayana Rao Venkatachaliah until 24 October, Aziz Mushabber Ahmadi

Governors
 Andhra Pradesh – Krishan Kant 
 Arunachal Pradesh – Mata Prasad 
 Assam – Loknath Mishra 
 Bihar – Akhlaqur Rahman Kidwai
 Goa – 
 until 3 April: Bhanu Prakash Singh 
 4 April-3 August: B. Rachaiah 
 starting 3 August: Gopala Ramanujam
 Gujarat – Sarup Singh
 Haryana – Dhanik Lal Mandal 
 Himachal Pradesh – Sudhakarrao Naik (starting 30 July)
 Jammu and Kashmir – K. V. Krishna Rao 
 Karnataka – Khurshed Alam Khan 
 Kerala – B. Rachaiah
 Madhya Pradesh – Mohammad Shafi Qureshi 
 Maharashtra – P.C. Alexander 
 Manipur – V. K. Nayar (until 22 December), O. N. Shrivastava (starting 23 December)
 Meghalaya – Madhukar Dighe
 Mizoram – P. R. Kyndiah 
 Nagaland – V. K. Nayar (until 4 August), O. N. Shrivastava (starting 4 August)
 Odisha – B. Satya Narayan Reddy
 Punjab – 
 until 9 July: Surendra Nath 
 9 July-18 September: Sudhakar Panditrao Kurdukar
 starting 18 September: Bakshi Krishan Nath Chhibber
 Rajasthan – Bali Ram Bhagat
 Sikkim – Radhakrishna Hariram Tahiliani (until 20 September), P. Shiv Shankar (starting 20 September)
 Tamil Nadu – Marri Chenna Reddy 
 Tripura – Romesh Bhandari 
 Uttar Pradesh – Motilal Vora
 West Bengal – K. V. Raghunatha Reddy

Events
 National income - 10,275,701 million
 26 January – India rolls out the short-range Prithvi missile at Republic Day Parade in New Delhi.
 20 May – Sushmita Sen was crowned Miss Universe 1994 in Manila, Philippines.
 26 August - Plague breakout in India from Surat.
 19 November – Aishwarya Rai was crowned Miss World 1994 in Sun City, South Africa.
 30 November - Nambi Narayanan arrested in connection with ISRO espionage case.

Law

Deaths
 4 January – Rahul Dev Burman, music director.
8 January - Jagadguru Sri Chandrashekarendra Saraswati Shankaracharya, 99, 68th guru of Kanchi Mutt (born 1894).
9 June – Dhirendra Brahmachari, Yoga guru and mentor of Indira Gandhi (born 1924).
 22 June – L. V. Prasad, actor, producer and director (born 1908).
11 November - Kuvempu, poet, writer and playwright (born 1904).

See also 
 Bollywood films of 1994

References

 
India
Years of the 20th century in India